JDS Nemuro (LST-4103) was the third ship of the s of the Japanese Maritime Self-Defense Force. She was commissioned on 27 October 1977.

Development and design
This gave them a maximum speed of 
.  

Vessels of the class carried two Landing Craft Vehicle Personnel (LCVPs). The LCVPs were slung under davits and a traveling gantry crane with folding rails that could be extended over the side handled the two LCMs positioned on the foredeck. The LSTs could carry up 130 troops. The Atsumi class were armed with twin-mounted  guns in a single turret placed each at the bow and aft. The LSTs were equipped with OPS-9 air search. They had a complement of 100 officers and crew.

Construction and career 
She was laid down by Sasebo Heavy Industries on November 18, 1976 as the No. 4103 planned transport ship in 1970 based on the 4th Defense Force Development Plan, launched on June 16, 1977. It was commissioned on 27 October 1977 and was incorporated into the Yokosuka District Force as a ship under direct control.

On June 27, 1980, a Tu-16 bomber of the Soviet Air Force approached abnormally while sailing about 110km north of Sado Island, Niigata Prefecture. The Tu-16, which was too close, crashed in front of her. The ship later contained the three bodies of the crew members.

She was engaged in several disaster dispatch activities such as the 1993 Hokkaidō earthquake that occurred on July 12, 1993 and the 2000 eruption of Miyakejima. On May 20, 2005, she was decommissioned.

Her anchor is preserved in front of Nemuro City Hall.

Citations

External links

Atsumi-class tank landing ships
Ships built by Sasebo Naval Arsenal
1977 ships